Trzebca  is a village in the administrative district of Gmina Nowa Brzeźnica, within Pajęczno County, Łódź Voivodeship, in central Poland.

The village has a population of 65.

References

Trzebca